A number of steamships have been named the  after the Rimutaka Mountains in New Zealand:

 , a 4,473-ton three-masted sail and steam ship operated by the New Zealand Shipping Company until 1899
 , a 7,765-ton liner of the New Zealand Shipping Company, operated until 1929
 , a passenger-cargo ocean liner owned by P&O and operated by the New Zealand Shipping Company 1938–1950 (formerly the 

Ship names